Cork is a barony in County Cork, Ireland, surrounding the city of Cork.  The barony comprises the former Liberties of Cork, the area which was within the county of the city of Cork but outside the municipal borough of Cork. The liberties were defined by the charter granted in 1608 by Charles I of England as extending three miles in all directions from the city walls. Under the Municipal Corporations Act (Ireland) 1840, the liberties were detached from the county of the city, and attached to the county of Cork as a new barony.

The Barony of Cork City comprises the former area of the municipal borough. No modifications to barony boundaries have been made since the Local Government (Ireland) Act 1898. The boundary of the city (previously county borough) of Cork has been extended since 1898 beyond the barony of Cork City and now includes parts of the barony of Cork.

Legal context
Baronies were created after the Norman invasion of Ireland as divisions of counties and were used the administration of justice and the raising of revenue. While baronies continue to be officially defined units, they have been administratively obsolete since 1898. However, they continue to be used in land registration and in specification, such as in planning permissions. In many cases, a barony corresponds to an earlier Gaelic túath which had submitted to the Crown.

Location
The barony, doughnut-like, entirely surrounds the Barony of Cork City. Other neighbouring baronies include Barrymore to the east, Barretts to the north-west, Muskerry East to the west,  and Kerrycurrihy to the south. The River Lee bisects the barony from west to east.

Subdivisions

The barony of Cork comprises part or all of 16 civil parishes:

References
From :

From other sources:

External links

Baronies of County Cork
Cork (city)